Banihari is a village in Narnaul subdistrict of Mahendragarh district, Haryana, India.

Notable People

Major Satish Dahiya (Shaurya Chakra)

References

Villages in Mahendragarh district